John Simon (born 12 March 1944) is a South African-born British classical music composer.

Education and musical career

The composer was born in Cape Town. He studied to be an economist at the University of Cape Town and left South Africa in 1965 as a result of apartheid and came to London where he studied composition part-time at Trinity College of Music and the Royal College of Music. His teachers included James Patten and John Lambert. He taught in the London Borough of Hillingdon for four years (1975–1979) where some of his earlier compositions received their premieres. In 1979 he returned to South Africa at the height of grand apartheid and taught music on the Cape Flats, while maintaining his creative work as composer. His opposition to apartheid led him to compose a series of orchestral works that were a response to the events of the time, including the death in custody of Steve Biko. These include his Threnody 1 for strings (subtitled Rage, rage against the dying of the light) and Threnody 2 for strings, clarinet and timpani (subtitled Steve Biko in Heaven), the first piece of serious music to use the current South African national anthem as a theme. His Requiem for Orchestra (originally entitled Requiem of 1984), a work in which the words of the Latin mass are sung by instruments rather than voices, and the pentagonal Violin Concerto dedicated to the victims of Sharpeville are larger scale paired works. A later 'struggle' piece was the symphonic suite Children of the Sun (Los Hijos del Sol), a musical depiction of key aspects of the conquest of the Incan Empire by the Spanish. All of these works make use of the opposing elements of serialism and tonality. His Requiem for Orchestra was premiered  by the BBC Philharmonic Orchestra, conducted by Edward Downes. Other BBC premières included those of his Violin Concerto and Wind Quintet. Threnody 2 has been widely performed and broadcast, inter alia at the Edinburgh International Festival and the Royal Scottish Academy of Music and Drama in Glasgow. It was under embargo at the SABC from 1987 to 1993.

Other orchestral works include his Piano Concerto No 1 (1969-2003), which combines serialism with tonality; Piano Concerto No 2 (1977-1979), a tonal work in accessible contemporary style; and his four-movement Symphony (1993-1997), which has as a unifying feature the vibrant rhythms of Africa, three of the movements being in fast tempi.

His chamber output consists mainly of works for solo instruments with piano. His most ambitious chamber works are his Wind Quintet of 1973 (UK Première given by the Vega Wind Quintet) and String Quartet of 2011.

His extensive output for solo piano includes five piano sonatas and a variety of solo works.

Between 2003 and 2005 he was composer-in-residence to the KwaZulu-Natal Philharmonic Orchestra in Durban and lecturer in orchestration at the University of KwaZulu-Natal's School of Music. He was charged with developing the KZNPO's New Music Initiative whose aim is to bring orchestral skills to KwaZulu-Natal-based composers and arrangers. He orchestrated the cantata Zizi Lethu (Our Hope) by KwaZulu-Natal composer Phelelani Mnomiya, written to celebrate ten years of South African democracy (2004). The work received its European premiere at the Barbican Centre in London where it was performed by the London Symphony Orchestra. This led to a new orchestral composition entitled Dance to Freedom. More recent works include A Peal of Bells for D. B. Cooper for strings, tubular bells and celesta; a symphonic suite around the Tristan legend, entitled Fanfares for Tristan, which includes quotations from Wagner's opera; and an anti-war 12-note composition entitled A Cry from a World Aflame for strings, trumpets and percussion (premiered by the BBC Philharmonic).

His latest work is the symphonic poem Seeing Stars, which is described as an entertaining piece. Coquette for solo flute was chosen to represent South Africa at the ISCM World Music Days in Beijing 2018.

Poetry and music

Simon has published poetry in journals and magazines in South Africa and the United Kingdom. Not surprisingly vocal music features in his output. His most substantial vocal work is his orchestral song cycle 'Portrait of Emily', settings of five of Emily Dickinson's poems. Other poets whose words he has set include Byron, Shelley, John Masefield, Wilfred Owen, Gerard Manley Hopkins and Matthew Arnold.

Orchestral works
Piano Concerto No 1 (1969–2003)  
Piano Concerto No 2 (1977–1979) 	
Little Suite for Orchestra (1978–2006)
Threnody 1 for String Orchestra (originally entitled ‘Rage, Rage against the Dying of the Light’) (1980)
New Azania Overture (also known as An Antipodean Overture) (1980)
Threnody 2 for Strings, Clarinet and Timpani (originally entitled ‘Steve Biko in Heaven’) (1981)
Violin Concerto (1981–1990)
Requiem for Orchestra originally entitled Requiem of 1984 (1983–1985)
Children of the Sun (Los Hijos del Sol) (1989)	 
Symphony (1993–1997) 
Late Gothic Overture (1996–1997)	
Dance to Freedom (2004–2005) 	
A Peal of Bells for D.B.Cooper (2006–2010)	
A Cry from a World Aflame for strings, trumpets and percussion (2009–2010) 
Fanfares for Tristan (2010–2011)
Seeing Stars (2015–2016)

Vocal works

Sea Fever (John Masefield for tenor and piano) (1965) 
The Pity of War (Wilfred Owen for tenor and piano) (1967-2002)
Five Romantic Songs (Byron and Shelley for tenor and piano) (1967)
Noël Ahoy! (Medieval English Christmas texts for children’s choir (1978-9)          
Dover Beach (Matthew Arnold for a cappella choir) (1983-2013)
Portrait of Emily (Emily Dickinson orchestral/ensemble song cycle) (1987) 
Justus quidem tu es, Domine (Gerard Manley Hopkins for a cappella choir) (2011)
Venice the Beautiful (composer's own words) (2015)

Literary works
Botsotso
New Contrast Literary Journal
Carapace
English Academy Review
New Coin Poetry

References

External links
John Simon (Official website)
List of works (Stellenbosch University Library and Information Service)
British Music Collection
Accolade Musikverlag
SA Composers' website
New Music South Africa website

Living people
1944 births
20th-century classical composers
21st-century classical composers
Musicians from Cape Town
Male classical composers
20th-century male musicians
21st-century male musicians
South African composers